UHB may refer to:

 Hokkaido Cultural Broadcasting, Japan
 UHB Facilities Ltd, of  University Hospitals Birmingham NHS Foundation Trust
 Ultra-high bypass turbofan or propfan
 Unhexbium, the 162nd element of extended periodic table